DaVinci Academy of Science and the Arts is a charter school district consisting of several campuses. It serves students of grades K-12 located in northern Utah. The main campus, including the administrative headquarters, is located in Ogden, Utah, United States.

History
DaVinci Academy started operation on April 15, 2004. It is named after Leonardo da Vinci.  Originally located in the Old Post Office Building, its main campus is now located in the American Can Company of Utah Building Complex in downtown Ogden. During its first year of operation, the student body consisted of the 9th and 10th grades. It has since expanded to include three other campuses that include an on-campus K–6 school and distance elementary school programs.

In the spring of 2007, the school had its first graduating class.

Renovations
In late 2008, the school board decided to purchase the building north of the school. In the beginning of the 2009−10 academic year, the building was opened for 7th−9th graders.

The school board then expanded into two more buildings at different locations in the downtown Ogden area. These buildings serve as an on-site elementary school and a headquarters for the online program.

The elementary program has also expanded to include a campus in Kaysville, Utah.

Academics
The charter of the school focuses on Performing Arts and Science.

Athletics
There are several sports played by the High School students at the school. Basketball, Bowling, Cross Country Running, Soccer, and Volleyball are the sports in which students participate. DaVinci Academy competes in the Utah School Sports Association with other charter and private schools in the Wasatch Front region of Utah.

External links
 DaVinci Academy
 DaVinci's Notebook

References

Charter schools in Utah
Educational institutions established in 2004
Public elementary schools in Utah
Public high schools in Utah
Public middle schools in Utah
Schools in Weber County, Utah
Schools in Utah
2004 establishments in Utah